Dhanwar, also known as Rajdhanwar, is a census town in the Dhanwar CD block in the Khori Mahua subdivision of the Giridih district in the Indian state of Jharkhand. It is a busiest business destination in the district Giridih.
Dhanwar is surrounded by river from three sides. This town is very famous for Hindu verdict festival Chhath puja in Jharkhand state. Every year, around 4 lakh people visit Dhanwar chhath ghat called "Rajghat" during the festival. Decoration of Rajghat occurs at huge-level that fascinates the visitors.

Geography

Location
It has an average elevation of 336 m (1102 ft). The town has a check dam (used for agriculture) called "Naulakha Dam" and many people come here for picnics. One of its administrative subdivisions Khori Mahuwa comprises five blocks such as Rajdhanwar, Jamua, Gawan, Tisri, and Deori.

Area overview
Giridih district is a part of the Chota Nagpur plateau, with rocky soil and extensive forests. Most of the rivers in the district flow from the west to east, except in the northern portion where the rivers flow north and north west. The district has coal and mica mines. It is an overwhelmingly rural district with small pockets of urbanisation.

Note: The map alongside presents some of the notable locations in the district. All places marked in the map are linked in the larger full screen map.

Civic administration

Police station
Dhanwar police station has its jurisdiction over Dhanwar CD block. According to the British records, the police station was established after Giridh subdivision formation came into existence in 1870.

CD Block HQ
The headquarters of Dhanwar CD Block are located at Dhanwar.

Demographics
According to the 2011 Census of India, Dhanwar had a total population of 8,777, of which 4,531 (52%) were males and 4,246 (48%) were females. Population in the age range 0–6 years was 1,253. The total number of literate persons in Dhanwar was 6,153 (81.78% of the population over 6 years).

As per 2001 India census, Dhanwar had a population of 7,935. Males constitute 51% of the population and females 49%. Dhanwar has an average literacy rate of 64%, higher than the national average of 59.5%. Male literacy is 73% while the female literacy is 55%. In Dhanwar, 16% of the population is under 6 years of age.

Infrastructure
According to the District Census Handbook 2011, Giridih, Dhanwar covered an area of 2.7 km2. Among the civic amenities, it had 14 km roads with both open and closed drains, the protected water supply involved tapwater from treated sources, uncovered well, overhead tank. It had 851 domestic electric connections, 55 road light points. Among the medical facilities, it had 1 hospital, 6 dispensaries, 6 health centres, 1 family welfare centre, 1 maternity and child welfare centre, 1 maternity home, 1 TB hospital/ clinic, 1 nursing home, 1 veterinary hospital, 10 medicine shops. Among the educational facilities it had 4 primary schools, 4 middle schools, 2 secondary schools, the nearest senior secondary school at Gangapur 5 km away, 1 general degree college. Among the social, cultural and recreational facilities, it had 1 cinema theatre. Three important commodities it produced were basketry, chura, sattu. It had the branch offices of 2 nationalised banks, 1 cooperative bank, 1 agricultural credit society.

Economy
Rajhanwar is a basic level business place. It has become a huge market place with millions of daily transactions. The main contributions to its business are made through the sale of Grains, Manihari goods, food products, cloth, jewellery, and metals.

Rajdhanwar is very famous for Gold, Silver ornaments and metals utensil. Electronic market is growing rapidly.

V2 Shopping Mall and Reliance Trends are shopping malls in Dhanwar.

Rajmani cinema hall is very old cinema theatre in Dhanwar strated in 1988.

Banks
 State Bank of India (SBI)
 Bank of India
Bandhan Bank (Banking Unit)
 Jharkhand Gramin Bank
 Jharkhand State Co-operative Bank

Automated teller machines - Bank Of India, SBI, 
Axis Bank - India 1 ATM
Various Customer service point(CSPs)
(Mini bank)

Transport 
Dhanwar is on the Hazaribag - Deoghar (Bagodar-Khorimahua) State Highway. It is about 42 km from GT Road (NH 19). 29 Kms away from Grand Cord Railway Line (Hazaribag Road). Koderma (Jhumri Tilaiya) is 50 Kms from Rajdhanwar.

Railway

Rajdhanwar has a railway station named Dhanwar at about 3 km from the centre of town. It is on the Madhupur-Giridih-Koderma line.

Education
There are many good schools for Primary & Secondary education. S S High School Dhanwar is one of finest among them in Giridih District. Student of this school scores Bihar Topper (erstwhile Bihar). In Higher education With the efforts of local residents, Adarsh College was established at Rajdanwar in 1973, under the leadership of the former MLA & freedom fighter, Lt. Punit Roy. It offers bachelor's courses in arts, science and commerce. A Teacher's Training College is also situated in Panchrukhi, Dhanwar.

Culture

Temple

Jharkhand Dham - It is situated approximately 55 km from Giridih and 10 km from Rajdhanwar. "Jharkhand Dham" which is considered one of the second most worshipped temple of Shiva after Baidhnath Dham in Deoghar.

Raja Mandir near Raja Tola. 

Gaytri Mandir, Ganesh Manadap and many others situated inside the Dhanwar market.

Hanuman Mandir- it is situated at Bada Chowk (cinema road) 3 km from Dhanwar station.

Shanidev Naugraha Mandir - It has recently built the only temple of Shani dev in the whole district. It is situated near the Rajghat.

Nawadih Mandap - It is situated at Ruputola Nawadih.

Chhat Puja
This town is very famous for Hindu verdict festival Chhath puja in Jharkhand state. Every year, around 4 lakh people visit Dhanwar chath ghat called "Rajghat" during the festival. Decoration of Rajghat occurs at huge-level that fascinates the visitors. Every single Road and street is filled with colourful lights, decorated, clean and full of devotion.

Healthcare
Refral Hospital is the government Hospital situated in Block Campus, Gandhi Chowk. Normal operations are done here. Some Private nursing Homes are also situated here.

Ayurveda Centres  
 Aarogya Vatika (Manihari Patty, Rajdhanwar) - specialises in arthritis, gastric and lung infection, blood pressure, and menstrual problems.

See also
Harihar Narayan Prabhakar

References

Giridih district
Cities and towns in Giridih district